The Berkshire Women's cricket team is the women's representative cricket team for the English historic county of Berkshire. They play their home games at various grounds across the county, including Summerleaze Road, Maidenhead and Falkland CC, Newbury, and are captained by Ashleigh Muttitt. They competed in Division One of the Women's County Championship until 2017, when they were relegated, and they won the Women's Twenty20 Cup in 2010. They are partnered with the regional side Southern Vipers.

History

1936–1999: Early History

Berkshire Women played their first recorded match in 1936, against Buckinghamshire Women, which they lost by 66 runs. When the Women's County Championship began in 1997, Thames Valley Women, which included Berkshire, competed, having also previously played in various regional competitions.

2000– : Women's County Championship

Berkshire joined the Women's County Championship in 2000, replacing Thames Valley, and finished 4th in Division 1 in their first season. After being relegated in 2003, they did not return to Division 1 until 2008, after which they became a consistently mid-table side. This period saw much greater success in the Women's Twenty20 Cup for Berkshire, reaching the final three times in a row between 2010 and 2012, including winning the competition in 2010, beating Yorkshire by 46 runs.  In 2017, Berkshire were relegated from Division 1 and have remained in Division 2 since, whilst also suffering two consecutive relegations in the T20 Cup. In 2021, they competed in the West Midlands Group of the Twenty20 Cup, but finished bottom with 4 losses and 4 abandoned matches. In 2022, the finished third in their group of the Twenty20 Cup. They also joined the South Central Counties Cup in 2022, finishing third out of six teams in the inaugural edition.

Players

Current squad
Based on appearances in the 2022 season. denotes players with international caps.

Notable players
Players who have played for Berkshire and played internationally are listed below, in order of first international appearance (given in brackets):

 Debra Stock (1992)
 Claire Taylor (1998)
 Isa Guha (2001)
 Alex Blackwell (2003)
 Rachel Priest (2007)
 Anya Shrubsole (2008)
 Victoria Lind (2009)
 Heather Knight (2010)
 Jodie Cook (2014)
 Linsey Smith (2018)
 Ellen Watson (2019)
 Lauren Bell (2022)

Seasons

Women's County Championship

Women's Twenty20 Cup

Honours
 County Championship:
 Division Two champions (1) – 2007
 Twenty20 Cup
 Champions (1) – 2010
 Division 3A champions (1) – 2009

See also
 Berkshire County Cricket Club
 Southern Vipers

References

Cricket in Berkshire
Women's cricket teams in England
Berkshire County Cricket Club
Cricket clubs established in 1936
1936 establishments in England